Konstantin Ivanovich Strakhovich (October 1, 1904 – November 21, 1969) was a Soviet fluid dynamicist and hydraulic engineer.

Education 
Konstantin Ivanovich Strakhovich was educated in the Mathematics and Mechanics Department at the Saint Petersburg State University (then called Petrograd University) . He continued his studies at the State Hydrological Institute specializing in gas dynamics and hydrodynamics. In 1925, his interest in hydropower lead him to Central Asia where he investigated its feasibility in various locations. In 1928 he submitted his PhD thesis on the hydromechanics of rigid bodies.

Political Prisoner 

Strakhovich is mentioned in the book Gulag Archipelago by Aleksandr Solzhenitsyn as having while in prison written down his confiscated engineering notebooks from memory. In 1952, he was sent to exile in Karaganda. In August 1955 sentence against him was nullified. After this 
he became the head of Heat Engineering at the Leningrad Polytechnic Institute and a professor of cryogenic technology in the department of Leningrad Technological Institute of the Refrigeration Industry.

Publications 
Gas dynamics in the application to artillery problems. Part 1. Fundamentals of gas dynamics, 1934;

Hydraulics: Lecture notes, 1934. Parts 1–2;

Fundamentals of the theory and calculation of pneumatic transport installations, 1934;

Centrifugal compressor machines: Lectures on theory and calculation, 1934–36 academic year, 1936. Part 1;

Applied gas dynamics, 1937;

Mechanics of a viscous fluids, 1940;

Centrifugal compressor machines, 1940;

Compressor machines, 1961 (in co-authorship);
The Lagrange equations of the second kind and their application to the solution of typical problems, 1961 (together with VP Yushkov);

Expansion machines, 1966;

Fundamentals of phenomenological thermodynamics: a summary of lectures. Riga, 1968;

Vectors and tensors, 1972 (together with P. P. Yushkov);

Hydro and gas dynamics, 1980.

References

1904 births
1969 deaths
Soviet engineers